Rimouski-Neigette—Témiscouata—Les Basques (formerly known as Rimouski—Témiscouata) is a federal electoral district in Quebec, Canada, that has been represented in the House of Commons of Canada since 2004.

Geography

This eastern Quebec riding includes the regional county municipalities of Rimouski-Neigette, Les Basques and Témiscouata, in the Quebec region of Bas-Saint-Laurent.

The neighbouring ridings are Montmagny—L'Islet—Kamouraska—Rivière-du-Loup, Montmorency—Charlevoix—Haute-Côte-Nord, Haute-Gaspésie—La Mitis—Matane—Matapédia, and Madawaska—Restigouche.

History

Rimouski-Neigette—Témiscouata—Les Basques was created in 2003 as "Rimouski—Témiscouata" from parts of Kamouraska—Rivière-du-Loup—Témiscouata—Les Basques and Rimouski-Neigette-et-La Mitis ridings. The district was given its present name in 2004.

Rimouski-Neigette—Témiscouata—Les Basques was a safe seat for Bloc Québécois until 2011, when New Democrat Guy Caron, an unsuccessful candidate in 2004, 2006 and 2008, unexpectedly won the riding in an NDP wave that swept throughout Quebec.

There was a proposal to change the riding's name to Centre-du-Bas-Saint-Laurent following the Canadian federal electoral redistribution, 2012; however, Parliament voted against this change. There were no territory changes to this riding as a result of the 2012 federal electoral redistribution.

Members of Parliament

This riding has elected the following Members of Parliament:

Election results

There were no territory changes for the 42nd Canadian federal election.

See also
 List of Canadian federal electoral districts
 Past Canadian electoral districts

References

Campaign expense data from Elections Canada
Riding history Rimouski--Témiscouata, Quebec (2003 - 2004) from the Library of Parliament
Riding history Rimouski-Neigette--Témiscouata--Les Basques, Quebec (2004 - 2008) from the Library of Parliament
2011 Results from Elections Canada

Notes

Quebec federal electoral districts
Rimouski